Bindaas may refer to:
 Bindaas (2008 film), a Kannada film directed by D. Rajendra Babu
 Bindaas (2010 film), a Telugu film directed by Veeru Potla
 Bindaas (2014 film), a Bengali film directed by Rajiv Kumar Biswas
 Bindhaast, a 1999 Marathi film by Chandrakant Kulkarni
 Bindass, a Hindi entertainment channel